Calera de Tango is a Chilean commune in the Maipo Province, Santiago Metropolitan Region.

Demographics
Of these, 9,932 (54.5%) lived in urban areas and 8,303 (45.5%) in rural areas. The population grew by 54% (6,392 persons) between the 1992 and 2002 censuses.

Administration
As a commune, Calera de Tango is a third-level administrative division of Chile administered by a municipal council, headed by an alcalde who is directly elected every four years. The 2012-2016 alcalde is Erasmo Valenzuela Santibáñez (IND). The communal council has the following members:
 Juan Irarrazaval Rossel (UDI)
 Marco Jofre Muñoz (PS)
 Carolina Saavedra Rojas (IND)
 Sandra Meza Zumelzu (PS)
 Marcelo Riquelme Yagi (PDC)
 Lilian Farias Nallar (RN)

Within the electoral divisions of Chile, Calera de Tango is represented in the Chamber of Deputies by Ramón Farías (PPD) and José Antonio Kast (UDI) as part of the 30th electoral district, (together with San Bernardo, Buin and Paine). The commune is represented in the Senate by Guido Girardi Lavín (PPD) and Jovino Novoa Vásquez (UDI) as part of the 7th senatorial constituency (Santiago-West).

References

External links
  Municipality of Calera de Tango

Communes of Chile
Populated places in Maipo Province